Vesicle-associated membrane protein 4 is a protein that in humans is encoded by the VAMP4 gene.

Function 

Synaptobrevins/VAMPs, syntaxins, and the 25-kD synaptosomal-associated protein SNAP25 are the main components of a protein complex involved in the docking and/or fusion of synaptic vesicles with the presynaptic membrane. The protein encoded by this gene is a member of the vesicle-associated membrane protein (VAMP)/synaptobrevin family. This protein may play a role in trans-Golgi network-to-endosome transport.

Interactions 

VAMP4 has been shown to interact with AP1M1, STX6 and STX16.

References

Further reading